Anchinia orientalis is a moth in the family Depressariidae. It was described by Aristide Caradja in 1939. It is found in Shanxi, China.

References

Moths described in 1939
Anchinia